Stade Municipal de USFAS is a stadium in Bamako, Mali. It is used mostly for football and serves as the home stadium of USFAS Bamako. The stadium has a capacity of 5,000 people.

Football venues in Mali
Buildings and structures in Bamako